The Barrington River is a small river in the South Shore region of Nova Scotia, Canada.

The river rises in Barrington Lake and flows generally southwards into Barrington Bay by the community of Barrington Head in the Municipality of the District of Barrington.

References 

Rivers of Nova Scotia